The First Amendment to the Constitution of Pakistan (Urdu: آئین پاکستان میں پہلی ترمیم) is a part of the Constitution of Pakistan which came on effect on May 4 of 1974. The official document of the First Amendment is called the Constitution (First Amendment) Act, 1974. The First Amendment redefined the international and provisional boundaries, federal treaties of Pakistan, and naval treaties of Pakistan. The amendment eliminates and removed the references of East-Pakistan after the recognition of Bangladesh.  Articles 1, 8, 17, 61, 101, 193, 199, 200, 209, 212, 250, 260 and 272, and the First Schedule of the Constitution of Pakistan were amended.

Text

External links
 Text of the Constitution (First Amendment) Act, 1974

01
Government of Zulfikar Ali Bhutto
1974 in Pakistani law